São Joaquim is a village in the western part of Príncipe Island in São Tomé and Príncipe. Its population is 93 (2012 census). São Joaquim is located 5 km southwest of the island capital of Santo António.

Population history

References

Populated places in the Autonomous Region of Príncipe